"Born Under Punches (The Heat Goes On)" is the opening track of the Talking Heads 1980 album Remain in Light.

Background and composition 
The track has a prominent bassline and sets the funk tone of the album. A live rendition of the song was included, with a long bass intro, on the 2004 re-issue of the live album The Name of This Band Is Talking Heads. It incorporates elements of African music, continuing an approach used in an earlier Talking Heads song "I Zimbra". The guitar solo beginning at around 2:45 was performed by Adrian Belew, who joined the band on the following tour, and later went on to join King Crimson.

Reception 
AllMusic critic Bill Janovitz describes the singer as being "another alienated, lost soul seeing a world filtered through his delusions and paranoia," similar to the protagonists in other Talking Heads' songs. Janovitz points to the following lyrics to support this assessment:
A government man
Born under punches
I'm a tumbler..I am not drowning man
And I am not a burning building...I'm so thin

Author Ian Gittens also describes the singer as being unstable, describing the song as being about "a harassed and apparently unstable 'Government Man'". Janovitz claims that the "thick menage of polyrhythmic percussion, staccato guitars, popping bass, and Devo-like electronic blips and bleeps" make this protagonist even more threatening than the one in the Talking Heads' earlier song "Psycho Killer".  Gittens likewise concurs that the contrast with "warmth and gravitas" of the "humane backing" deepens the impression of the singer being unstable.  Janovitz notes David Byrne's vocal performance in speaking and shouting his bitter lines and threats through the complex music.  Gittens particularly praises Brian Eno's production, stating that the way Eno layered the multiple guitar, bass guitar and drum parts gave the song an "original, sharply conceived and imposingly textured" sound.

It was named as one of the best songs released between 1980 and 1982 in the 2008 book The Pitchfork 500: Our Guide to the Greatest Songs from Punk to the Present.

Release history 
A medley of "Born Under Punches (The Heat Goes On)" with two other songs from Remain in Light, "Crosseyed and Painless" and "Once in a Lifetime," reached #20 on the Billboard Dance Music/Club Play Singles chart. The song was released as a single in Japan. The single's B-side track is a live performance of "Cities" from the August 24, 1979 concert at the Berklee Performance Center.

An 8:24 extended version appears on the 2004 reissue of The Name of This Band Is Talking Heads.

The song was included as the first track to Röyksopp's mix album Back to Mine.

References

1980 songs
Talking Heads songs
Songs written by David Byrne
Songs written by Brian Eno
Song recordings produced by Brian Eno
Songs written by Jerry Harrison
Songs written by Chris Frantz
Songs written by Tina Weymouth